Champsodon vorax, also known as the greedy gaper, is a species of marine ray-finned fish, a crocodile toothfish belonging to the family Champsodontidae. It occurs in the Indo-West Pacific from Maldives, Australia, Vietnam, Philippines, Indonesia and Guam. It has also been recorded in the Mediterranean Sea off the coast of Lebanon.

References

vorax
Fish described in 1867
Taxa named by Albert Günther